John Smiley may refer to: 

John Smiley (baseball) (born 1965), Major League Baseball pitcher
John Smiley (author), technology author and teacher
John S. Smiley (1885–1945), Canadian politician in the Nova Scotia House of Assembly

See also
John Smillie (disambiguation)